Laurel Elmer Youmans (1863-1926) was a member of the Wisconsin State Assembly.

Biography
Youmans was a native of Mukwonago, Wisconsin. He graduated from what is now the University of Wisconsin-Madison and became a physician. His son John B. Youmans (1893-1979) was a notable nutritionist.

Career
Youmans was a member of the Assembly in 1911. He was a Republican.

References

External links
The Political Graveyard

People from Mukwonago, Wisconsin
Republican Party members of the Wisconsin State Assembly
University of Wisconsin–Madison alumni
1863 births
1926 deaths